Nin (or Nona) is a town in the Zadar County of Croatia, population 1,132, total municipality population 2,744 (2011).

Nin was historically important as a centre of a medieval Christian Diocese of Nin. Nin was also the seat of the Princes of Dalmatia.

Geography
Nin's historical center is located on an islet only 500 meters in diameter. Nin is situated in a lagoon on the eastern shore of the Adriatic Sea, surrounded by natural sandy beaches and linked with the mainland by two stone bridges from the 16th century.

History
According to historians the area of Nin appears to have been settled 10,000 years ago. The present-day town on the islet developed 3,000 years ago and is one of the older towns on the eastern Adriatic. The area of Nin was first colonized by immemorial people of the Mediterranean.

Since the 9th century B.C. the civilization of the Illyrian tribe of Liburnians was present before the Romans came, who had a strong sea and trade center called Aenona (this morphed in the Middle Ages into Nona). The rich archeological finds prove strong sea links with Greece and the Hellenistic world: recent explorations revealed a rarity, a very well preserved Byzantine mosaic on the floor of a Roman villa.

The Croats arrived in Nin in the 8th century. The first Croatian state community was formed in the 9th century. Nin was the first Croatian royal town, with its period of glory being from the 7th to the 13th centuries. In the 9th century Nin became the seat of the first Croatian bishop. Bishops from Nin played a great role in the country's religious, a cultural and a political sense. Significant rulers connected with the history of Nin include Prince Višeslav, Prince Branimir, King Tomislav, King Petar Krešimir IV, King Zvonimir. Up to the abolition and Latinization imposed by King Tomislav in the first half of the 10th century, Nin was the centre of the autonomous Croatian branch of the Church. The Bishop Gregory of Nin (Grgur Ninski) was an important figure in the 10th century ecclesiastical politics of Dalmatia.

At the time of the Turkish wars, Nin found itself on the battle-field. After the selling of Dalmatia to Venice (1409), the city came under the control of the Republic of Venice. The town was economically exploited but not protected militarily. Subsequently, the town was destroyed twice.

The first destruction was in 1571 and the second in 1646. On both occasions, the Venice government gave an order to burn the town and destroy it systematically before abandoning it, so that the Ottomans could not use it as a stronghold. After the 1646 destruction, Nin was never restored to its former condition, and lost its original importance.

The economic development of Nin began after World War II. Since 1969, Nin has been developing as a tourist destination. Nin today is a historical and tourist town which looks for its development in the valorization of its historical heritage. In recent years, many monuments have been restored.  Because of the importance of Nin in the history of Croatia, tourists visit from Croatia and elsewhere in Europe. They come especially to visit two symbols of the old town: the church of Holy Cross from the 9th century, called “the smallest cathedral in the world”, and the coronation church.

After 1980 near Nin a high power medium wave broadcasting station was built.

Population
According to the 2011 census, there were 2,744 inhabitants in the area of the City of Nin, and 1,132 inhabitants in Nin itself.

References

Further reading

External links
 
 
 Nin tourist site
 St. Nicholas of Nin Chapel, 11th century
 Nin sea salt production and museum
 Nin photos
 Queen Beach Nin

Cities and towns in Croatia
Populated coastal places in Croatia
Former capitals of Croatia
Populated places in Zadar County
Illyrian Croatia